Calamocha is a town and municipality of Teruel province in the autonomous community of Aragon, Spain. In 2015 the municipality had a population of 4,417 inhabitants.

Calamocha is the administrative centre of the Aragonese comarca of Jiloca.

Villages 
As well as the town of Calamocha itself, the following villages and hamlets form part of the municipality:
Collados
Cuencabuena
Cutanda
Lechago 
Luco de Jiloca
Navarrete del Río
Nueros
Olalla
El Poyo del Cid
Valverde
Villarejo de los Olmos

References

External links 

 calamochinos.com Calamocha Municipal Portal
 Centro de Estudios del Jiloca
 Forum de Calamocha

Municipalities in the Province of Teruel